Bobby Nokolak Anavilok is a Canadian Inuk politician, who was elected to the Legislative Assembly of Nunavut in the 2021 Nunavut general election. He represents the electoral district of Kugluktuk.

Prior to his election to the legislature, Anavilok worked in Kugluktuk as a hunter and stone carver.

References

Living people
Members of the Legislative Assembly of Nunavut
Inuit from the Northwest Territories
Inuit politicians
Inuit artists
People from Kugluktuk
21st-century Canadian politicians
Inuit from Nunavut
Year of birth missing (living people)